Lactura pyrilampis is a moth of the family Lacturidae. It was described by Edward Meyrick in 1886. It is found on New Guinea and Papua New Guinea.

References

Moths described in 1924
Zygaenoidea